Gahcho Kue Aerodrome  is an airport located  east southeast of the Gahcho Kue Diamond Mine Project, Northwest Territories, Canada. The airport is owned and operated by De Beers Canada and serves the Gahcho Kue Diamond Mine Project. The ice runway was only open from January to April.

References

Registered aerodromes in the North Slave Region
De Beers

es:Aeropuerto de Fort Smith
pms:Fort Smith Airport